Summer is the first Japanese EP from South Korean boy band Boyfriend. It was released physically and digitally July 12, 2017.

Background and promotion 
On May 22, 2017, Kiss Entertainment announced through Twitter that the group would be making a return to the Japanese market by releasing their first Japanese EP. It was later confirmed that the EP would be released in two different limited editions along with six different standard editions with individual member covers.

Track listing

Music videos

Release history

References 

Boyfriend (band) songs
2017 EPs
Japanese-language songs
Starship Entertainment singles